John Osborn may refer to:

John Osborn (politician) (1922–2015), British MP 1959–1987
John Osborn (sailor) (born 1945), British sailor, Olympic champion and world champion
John Osborn (tenor) (born 1972), American tenor
Sir John Osborn, 5th Baronet (1772–1848), British Member of Parliament
John A. Osborn (1939–2000), British chemist
John E. Osborn (mathematician) (1936–2011), American mathematician
John E. Osborn (lawyer) (born 1957), American lawyer, health care industry executive and diplomat
John Jay Osborn (1917–2014), American physician
John Jay Osborn Jr. (born 1945), American author
John Robert Osborn (1899–1941), Canadian World War II Victoria Cross recipient

See also 
John Osborne (disambiguation)
John Osbourne, real name of singer Ozzy Osbourne